is a Japanese actress, fashion model and gravure model.  

Itō was once represented by Ever Green Entertainment.  She gained notable fame near the end of 2017 for her involvement in the Long Long Man commercials produced by UHA for their Sakeru Gummy brand.

Biography
By the time she was in fourth grade, Itō started working as a magazine model. In 2005, she joined Ever Green Entertainment. Itō made regular appearances in "Oha Girl" of Oha Suta along with Mayu Matsuoka and Hidemi Hikita from 7 April 2008 until 26 March 2010.  In November 2011, she was chosen as the Miss Weekly Young Jump of Gravure Japan co-hosted by Weekly Young Jump and Weekly Playboy.

Itō left Ever Green Entertainment in April 2016. 
In June 2016, she joined the talent agency Cube.

Filmography

Films

Stage

Internet

Variety series

Magazines

Advertisements

Advertising

Music videos

Publications

Videos

Notes

References

External links
Official profile at Cube 

1996 births
Living people
Actresses from Tokyo
Japanese child actresses
Japanese female models